Run This may refer to:

 "Run This", a 2013 song by Thugli, the video of which won Director of the Year at the 2014 Much Music Video Awards
 "Run This", a 2018 song by Exo from Countdown

See also
 I Run This
 We Run This
 Run This Town